The Eunice Kennedy Shriver National Institute of Child Health and Human Development (NICHD) is one of the National Institutes of Health (NIH) in the United States Department of Health and Human Services. It supports and conducts research aimed at improving the health of children, adults, families, and communities, including:
Reducing infant deaths
Promoting healthy pregnancy and childbirth
Investigating growth and human development
Examining problems of birth defects and intellectual and developmental disabilities
Understanding reproductive health
Enhancing function across the lifespan through rehabilitation research

History
The impetus for NICHD came from the Task Force on the Health and Well-Being of Children, convened in 1961 and led by Dr. Robert E. Cooke, a senior medical advisor to President John F. Kennedy. Eunice Kennedy Shriver also served on the task force, which reported that more research was needed on the physical, emotional, and intellectual growth of children.

The U.S. Congress established NICHD in 1962 as the first NIH institute to focus on the entire life process rather than on a specific disease or body system. NICHD became a funding source for research on birth defects and intellectual and developmental disabilities (IDDs), created a new pediatrics specialty, and established IDDs as a field of research. The institute also focused on the idea that adult health has its origins in early development and that behavior and social science were important aspects of human development.

On December 21, 2007, by act of Congress (Public Law 110–54), NICHD was renamed the Eunice Kennedy Shriver National Institute of Child Health and Human Development in honor of Mrs. Shriver's vision, dedication, and contributions to the founding of the institute.

Past Directors
Past Directors from 1963 -present

Mission
The mission of NICHD is to ensure that every person is born healthy and wanted, that women suffer no harmful effects from reproductive processes, and that all children have the chance to achieve their full potential for healthy and productive lives, free from disease or disability, and to ensure the health, productivity, independence, and well-being of all people through optimal rehabilitation.

Operation
As of November 2016, the director of NICHD is Diana W. Bianchi.

NICHD's budget in 2015 was an estimated $1.3 billion, which supported research at institutions, universities, and organizations throughout the world, as well as research conducted by NICHD scientists on the NIH campus in Bethesda, MD, and at other facilities.

Components
Office of the Director
Division of Extramural Research
Child Development and Behavior Branch
Contraceptive Discovery and Development Branch
Developmental Biology and Structural Variation Branch
Fertility and Infertility Branch
Gynecologic Health and Disease Branch
Intellectual and Developmental Disabilities Branch
Maternal and Pediatric Infectious Disease Branch
Obstetric and Pediatric Pharmacology and Therapeutics Branch
Pediatric Growth and Nutrition Branch
Pediatric Trauma and Critical Illness Branch
Population Dynamics Branch
Pregnancy and Perinatology Branch
National Center for Medical Rehabilitation Research
Division of Intramural Population Health Research
Biostatistics and Bioinformatics Branch
Epidemiology Branch
Health Behavior Branch
Division of Intramural Research
Office of the Scientific Director
Scientific Affinity Groups
Aquatic Models of Human Development
Basic Mechanisms of Genome Regulation
Behavioral Determinants and Developmental Imaging
Bone and Matrix Biology in Development and Disease
Cell and Structural Biology
Cell Regulation and Development
Developmental Endocrine Oncology and Genetics
Genetics and Epigenetics of Development
Integrative Membrane, Cell, and Tissue Pathophysiology
Metals Biology and Molecular Medicine
Neurosciences
Pediatric Endocrinology, Metabolism, and Molecular Genetics
Perinatal and Obstetrical Research
Reproductive Endocrine and Gynecology

National Children's Study
The National Children's Study (NCS) was a longitudinal cohort study that planned to recruit participants from across the United States of America. The NCS was led by the National Institutes of Health, with the NICHD serving as the scientific lead. It was intended to measure the many factors that contribute to health and disease from before birth through age 21. This included, but was not limited to, the search for drivers of diseases with prenatal or developmental origins. The Study was closed in December 2014.

Organization
Within NICHD, the NCS Program Office administered the implementation of day-to-day Study operations. The Program Office was supervised by the Study Director, Steven Hirschfeld, MD, PhD Associate Director for Clinical Research, NICHD.

For advice and recommendations regarding Study framework, content, and methodologies, the NCS Program Office engaged external advisors and scientific groups. These groups included federal partners such as the NCS Federal Advisory Committee and a Federal Consortium with representatives from multiple federal agencies including: the U.S. Department of Health and Human Services, the National Institute of Environmental Health Sciences of the National Institutes of Health, the Centers for Disease Control and Prevention, and the U.S. Environmental Protection Agency. An independent Study Monitoring and Oversight Committee monitored study progress and participant safety.

In addition to these more formal channels, the NCS solicited feedback from subject matter experts from around the world and from individuals, community advocates, and professional societies concerned with child health. The NCS Program Office also provided public forums for input on a variety of initiatives.

Congressional Mandate
The "President's Task Force on Health Risks and Safety Risks to Children" recommended this federal initiative in 1999, after which Congress passed the Children's Health Act of 2000 (Title X, Section 1004). The Act charged NICHD to:

 plan, develop, and implement a prospective cohort study, from birth to adulthood, to evaluate the effects of both chronic and intermittent exposures on child health and human development; and
 investigate basic mechanisms of developmental disorders and environmental factors, both risk and protective, that influence health and developmental processes.

The Act required this NCS to:
 incorporate behavioral, emotional, educational, and contextual consequences to enable a complete assessment of the physical, chemical, biological, and psychosocial environmental influences on children's well-being;
 gather data on environmental influences and outcomes on diverse populations of children, which may include the consideration of prenatal exposures; and
 consider health disparities among children, which may include the consideration of prenatal exposures

Objective
The NCS was designed to examine the effects of the environment—broadly defined to include factors such as air, water, diet, sound, family dynamics, community, and cultural influences— and genetics on the growth, development, and health of children across the United States. The NCS was designed to follow approximately 100,000 children, some from before birth, through age 21 years. The NCS planned to collect comprehensive information to:
 contribute to improving the health and well-being of all children
 deepen our understanding of the contribution of various factors to a range of health and disease outcomes
 understand factors that lead to health disparities.

With this broad perspective, the NCS was designed to contribute to the implementation of health equity, where each individual has an opportunity to realize their health potential.

Discontinued
The NCS was in its Vanguard, or pilot phase, which was designed to assess the feasibility, acceptability, cost, and utility of Study scientific output, logistics, and operations prior to initiating the Main Study. The Vanguard Study enrolled about 5,000 children in 40 counties across the United States. General recruitment was completed in July 2013.

On December 12, 2014, the National Children's Study closed, after an expert review committee advised the NIH Director that moving forward with the larger Main Study would not be the best way to add to the understanding of how environmental and genetic factors influence child health and development.

Notable accomplishments
NICHD has made numerous contributions to improving the health of children, adults, families, and communities. Selected research advances from 2015 include improving the health of infants born preterm, encouraging healthy behaviors, and optimizing rehabilitation.

See also
National Institutes of Health
United States Department of Health and Human Services

Notes and references

Further reading

External links

 
 
 National Institutes of Health website
 U.S. Department of Health and Human Services website

National Institutes of Health
Medical research institutes in the United States
Pediatrics in the United States